Jane Furse is a town in the Sekhukhune District Municipality of the Limpopo province in South Africa, surrounded by the villages of Ga-Moretsele, Madibong, Marulaneng, Mamone, Mokwete and Riverside.

Significant landmarks in Jane Furse include Jane Furse Plaza, Jane Furse Memorial Hospital (the largest public sector hospital in the Sekhukhune District) and St Mark's College. Jane Furse Crossing, another shopping centre, opened in 2013 and is situated at the main four-way intersection in the town.

History 

Jane Furse developed around the Jane Furse Memorial Hospital and other infrastructure - including schools, clinics and churches - built by Christian missionaries belonging to the Anglican and Roman Catholic denominations. The Jane Furse Memorial Hospital was founded by the Rt. Revd Michael Furse, the Anglican Bishop of Pretoria from 1909 - 1920, and is named after his daughter, Jane Diana Furse, born 1904, who died of scarlet fever in 1918. Christian missionaries were also responsible for the construction of St. Rita's Hospital (situated at Ga-Moloi village) and St. Marks College (situated in the heart of Jane Furse).

Government 

Jane Furse serves as the seat of the Makhuduthamaga Local Municipality, one of the four local municipalities under the Sekhukhune District.

Most of the land in Jane Furse falls under the authority of traditional leaders, known as magoshi (singular = kgoshi).

The area is governed by the African National Congress (ANC). The Economic Freedom Fighters (EFF) serves as the main opposition party.

Culture 

The town is host to the Sekhukhune Community Radio. Other media serving the area include Thobela FM, the Polokwane-based South African Broadcasting Corporation (SABC) radio station and Capricorn FM, a commercial radio station also based in Polokwane.

A unique genre of music is found in Jane Furse and surrounding areas. Known as "Tja Manyalo" (wedding songs), this type of music is almost exclusively produced in and around Sekhukhune areas.

Sepedi is the predominant language spoken in Jane Furse.  Other languages spoken here include Swati and Southern Ndebele.

Education 

Several primary and secondary schools are located in Jane Furse, catering to a student population estimated at 90,000. Most of the schools are public, with one private school. The list is as follows:

 Leap Science and Maths School
 St Mark's College
 St. Mark's Primary School
 Jane Furse Comprehensive School
 Jane Furse Primary School
 Arethabeng Primary School
 Bafedi Primary School
 Baropodi Comprehensive 
 Kgolane Secondary School
 Lengama Secondary School
 Madibong Primary School
 Matsebong Secondary School
 Ngwana-matlang Secondary school
Moretsele primary School
Mookwane Primary School
Lehutjwana Secondary School
Bonega-Madikubung Primary School
Dikgabje Primary School
Mashegoanyane Primary School
Kopanong Primary School
Rebone Secondary School
Thulare Primary School
Mpilo Secondary School

Health facilities

Hospitals serving the area
 New Jane Furse Hospital
 St Ritas Hospital

Clinics
Ditšhweung Community Clinic
Madibong Community Clinic

Notable people 
The following is a list of notable people associated with Jane Furse. 
 Manche Masemola, Christian martyr
 Kgoshi Mampuru (died 22 November 1883), after whom the Kgoshi Mampuru prison and street, both in Pretoria, are named
 Godfrey Pitje, teacher, anti-apartheid activist and President of the ANC Youth League, succeeded by Nelson Mandela in 1951. 
 Aaron Motsoaledi, Minister of Home Affairs
 Joe Phaahla, Minister of Health
Namane Dickson Masemola, Member of the Executive Council (MEC) responsible for Public Works, Limpopo Provincial Government.
Elias Phakane Moretsele ANC anti-apartheid activist and 1956 Treason Trialist
Edgar Marutlulle, Blue Bulls Rugby player

References 

Populated places in the Makhuduthamaga Local Municipality